is a Japanese writer from Fukuoka Prefecture. He is known mainly for his work in anime and tokusatsu. After having graduated from Tokyo Zokei University, he worked as a freelance writer in Arakawa and would attend various film festivals. Then, he studied with Kanji Kashiwabara and proceeded to win the Otomo Shoji Award seven times and became a screenwriter.

Television
 Series head writer denoted in bold

Anime
 Lupin III: The Pursuit of Harimao’s Treasure (1995)
 Bonobono (1995)
 Saint Tail (1995-1996)
 Wankorobee (1996-1997)
 Lupin III: Walther P-38/Island of Assassins (1997)
 Manmaru the Ninja Penguin (1997-1998)
 Berserk (1997-1998)
 Pokémon (1997-2002)
 Bomberman B-Daman Bakugaiden (1998)
 The Adventures of Mini-Goddess (1998)
 Monster Rancher (1999-2001)
 Figure 17 (2001-2002)
 Lupin III Episode 0: First Contact (2002)
 Cyborg 009: The Cyborg Soldier (2002)
 Hanada Shōnen Shi (2002)
 Daigunder (2002)
 Pokémon: Advanced (2002-2006)
 Ninja Scroll: The Series (2003)
 Croquette! (2003-2004)
 Uninhabited Planet Survive! (2003-2004)
 Agatha Christie%27s Great Detectives Poirot and Marple (2004-2005)
 Gunparade Orchestra (2006)
 Glass Fleet (2006)
 Death Note (2006-2007)
 Silk Road Boy Yuto (2006-2007)
 The Cuties (2006-2008)
 Working Kids, Meister Hamster Team (2007-2008)
 MapleStory (2007-2008)
 Stitch! (2008-2009)
 Negibozu no Asataro (2008-2009)

 Guin Saga (2009) 
 Kaidan Restaurant (2009-2010)
 Fairy Tail (2009-2016, 2018-2019)
 HeartCatch PreCure! (2010-2011)
 Digimon Fusion (2010-2012)
 Pokémon: Black & White (2010-2014)
 Little Battlers Experience (2011)
 Suite PreCure (2011)
 Smile PreCure! (2012-2013)
 Hunter × Hunter (2012-2014)
 DokiDoki! Precure (2013-2014)
 One Piece (2013-present)
 Parasyte -the maxim- (2014-2015)
 Ushio and Tora (2015-2016)
 Tiger Mask W (2016-2017)
 Yu-Gi-Oh! VRAINS (2017-2018)
 Karakuri Circus (2018-2019)
 Wave, Listen to Me! (2020)
 Butt Detective (2020)
 Talentless Nana (2020)
 Shaman King (2021-2022)
 Futsal Boys!!!!! (2022)

Live action
 Sh15uya (2005)
 Kamen Rider Hibiki (2005)
 Kamen Rider Kabuto (2006)
 Kamen Rider Den-O (2007)
 Kamen Rider Kiva (2008)
 Kamen Rider G (2009)
 Kamen Rider Decade (2009): eps 14-31
 Kamen Rider OOO (2010-2011)

Film

Anime
 Mt. Head (2002)
 Otogi-Jūshi Akazukin (2005)
 Smile Precure! the Movie: Big Mismatch in a Picture Book (2012)
 Hunter × Hunter: Phantom Rouge (2013)
 Pokémon the Movie: I Choose You! (2017)
 Fairy Tail: Dragon Cry (2017)
 Pretty Cure Super Stars! (2018)

Live action
 Hinokio (2005)
 Kamen Rider Kabuto: God Speed Love (2006)
 Kamen Rider Decade: All Riders vs. Dai-Shocker (2009)
 Kamen Rider x Kamen Rider W & Decade: Movie War 2010 (2009)
 Kamen Rider Decade: The Last Story
 Movie War 2010
 Kamen Rider x Kamen Rider x Kamen Rider The Movie: Cho-Den-O Trilogy (2010)
 Episode Yellow: Treasure de End Pirates 
 OOO, Den-O, All Riders: Let’s Go Kamen Riders (2011)
 Kamen Rider x Super Sentai: Super Hero Taisen (2012)
 Kamen Rider x Super Sentai x Space Sheriff: Super Hero Taisen Z (2013)
 Heisei Rider vs. Shōwa Rider: Kamen Rider Taisen feat. Super Sentai (2014)
 Super Hero Taisen GP: Kamen Rider 3 (2015)
 Ultra Super Hero Taisen (2017)
 Kamen Rider Den-O: Pretty Den-O Appears! (2020)

References

External links
 Shoji Yonemura anime at Media Arts Database 

Japanese writers
Living people
Writers from Fukuoka Prefecture
1964 births
Tokyo Zokei University alumni